Protests against Hillary Clinton have occurred throughout the United States and worldwide during her tenure as United States Secretary of State and her 2016 campaign for the presidency.

Protests during Clinton's tenure as Secretary of State

2012
 July 16 - Protesters in Alexandria, Egypt threw tomatoes at Clinton's motorcade after she left the newly opened United States consulate.

Campaign protests

2015
 November 1 - Black Lives Matter protesters interrupted a Clinton campaign rally in Atlanta.

2016
 July 24 - Supporters of Bernie Sanders marched in Philadelphia, outside the site of the 2016 Democratic National Convention, proclaiming that they will not vote for Clinton.
 Numerous Haitain-Americans made several protests against Hillary in response to the controversies of the 2010 Haiti earthquake relief money.

References

Hillary Clinton controversies
Protests in the United States
Clinton, Hillary